is the first single of the J-pop idol group Morning Musume subgroup Morning Musume Otomegumi. In addition to the title song and its karaoke version, the single also contains a Morning Musume Otomegumi version of the earlier Morning Musume song "Dekkai Uchū ni Ai ga Aru", which was originally a b-side on the single "The Peace!". Morning Musume Sakuragumi also did a version of "Dekkai Uchū ni Ai ga Aru" at the same time as Morning Musume Otomegumi on the "Hare Ame Nochi Suki" single.

Track listing 
All songs are written and composed by Tsunku and are arranged by Suzuki Shunsuke.

CD 
 
 
 "Ai no Sono (Touch My Heart!)" (Instrumental)

Single V DVD 
 "Ai no Sono: Touch My Heart"

Members at the time of single 
1st generation: Kaori Iida
4th generation: Rika Ishikawa, Nozomi Tsuji
5th generation: Makoto Ogawa
6th generation: Miki Fujimoto, Sayumi Michishige, Reina Tanaka

Musical personnel 
Kaori Iida – vocals
Rika Ishikawa – vocals
Nozomi Tsuji – vocals
Makoto Ogawa – vocals
Miki Fujimoto – vocals
Sayumi Michishige – vocals
Reina Tanaka – vocals
Tsunku – composer, background vocals
Suzuki Shunsuke – arranger

Charts

Performances

In television shows 
2003-09-25 – Utaban

In concerts

References

External links 
"Ai no Sono ~Touch My Heart" entries on the Up-Front Works official website: CD entry, DVD entry
"Ai no Sono ~Touch My Heart" entries on the Hello! Project official website: CD entry, DVD entry
Projecthello.com lyrics: Ai no Sono (Touch My Heart!), Dekkai Uchū ni Ai ga Aru

Morning Musume songs
2003 singles
Song recordings produced by Tsunku
Songs written by Tsunku
Japanese-language songs
Japanese synth-pop songs
Dance-pop songs